The Great Kurultáj or briefly Kurultáj is a traditional event of peoples of Central Asian nomadic origins, which takes place in the first week of August in Bugac, Hungary. The aim of this event is to strengthen the unity of the Eurasian steppe-nomadic horse culture and traditions between Hungarians and their cultural relatives, eastern Turkic peoples and Altaic peoples. The first Kurultáj was held in the Torgay Region of Kazakhstan in 2007. The first Kurultáj in Hungary was held in 2008. These events contributed much to the revival of the Altaic self-awareness.

Kurultáj is a widely attended event for professional horsemen and fans of horse riding. Each Kurultáj holds the parade of horsemen, horse races, traditional horsemen wrestling, and various tournaments. Hungary is the only European nation to have preserved the traditional kokpar game, a strategic team sport for riders.

Background

Editions

 2007 in kazakhistan

By Hungarian Turan Foundation:

 2008
 2013
 2014
 2015
 2016
 2018
 2022 - 12-14 August - 27 nations. participating nations and tribes: Azerbaijani, Avar, Bashkir, Bulgarian, Balkar, Buryat, Chuvash, Gagauz, Kabardino, Karachay, Karakalpak, Kazakh, Madjar tribe of Kazakhstan, Kirghiz, Kumi, Mongolian, Nogai, Uzbek, Madzsar tribe of Uzebekistan, Tatar, Turkish, Tuva, Turkoman, Uyghur, Yakut, Hungarian.

2020  Cancelled.

Participating nations and states (47)
13 Nation and 33 states from:

 Turkic people
 Uralic people
 Mongolic people
 Tungusic people
 Caucasian people

Nations:

Turkic languages (22)

 Crimean Tatars
 Cypriot Turks
 

 Madjars
 Nogai

 

 Uyghurs
 Turkomans

Uralic languages (11)
 Csangos
 
 
 (Host)
 Karelians
 Khanty-Mansi

 Nenets
 Sápmi
 Szekely

Mongolic languages (3)

Northeast Caucasian languages (3)
 Avar

Indo-European Languages (3)

 Hazara

Northwest Caucasian languages (2)

 Kabardin

Tungusic languages (2)
 Evenki
 Manchus

Others (2)

2022
Participating nations and tribes is 27:

Azerbaijani, Avar, Bashkir, Bulgarian, Balkar, Buryat, Chuvash, Gagauz, Kabardino, Karachay, Karakalpak, Kazakh, Madjar tribe of Kazakhstan, Kirghiz, Kumi, Mongolian, Nogai, Uzbek, Madzsar tribe of Uzebekistan, Tatar, Turkish, Tuva, Turkoman, Uyghur, Yakut, Hungarian.

9 Country + 18 state

Name
The word ”kurultáj” and its variations in the Turkic languages translates as “meeting of the tribes”. It occurs amongst tribal nations and practically in all the nomadic cultures. Hungarian nomadic tribes also held these meetings, a fact that is mentioned in Byzantine and Arab written sources. At such meetings, important decisions were made, in particular, the leaders of the tribes would meet often to discuss military decisions and strategies.

Events

 2008: unknown
 2013: 9 to 11 August.
 2014: Took place at Bugac in the Southern Great Plain region in Hungary.
 2015: Organized by the Hungarian Turan Foundation with contributions from the Turkish Cooperation and Coordination Agency (TİKA) and named the year's event Ancestors Day. Representatives from the governments of Hungary and Turkey joined the festivities as well.
 2016: Took place from 12 to 14 August at Bugac.
 2018: unknown
 2020: cancelled 
 2022: culture + music + sports (horse + archery + Guresh)

Medalists:

Gallery

See also
 Altaic language
 Huns
 Kurultai
 Hungarian Turanism
 Pan-Turanism
 Pan Turkism
 World Turks Qurultai
 Treaty of Trianon
 Bugac
 Jirga
 List of festivals in Europe

References

External links

Bugac // Puszta . com
Information

Cultural festivals in Hungary
Festivals in Hungary
Equestrian festivals
Hungarian Turanism